The California Department of Motor Vehicles (DMV) is the state agency that registers motor vehicles and boats and issues driver licenses in the U.S. state of California.  It regulates new car dealers (through the New Motor Vehicle Board), commercial cargo carriers, private driving schools, and private traffic schools. The DMV works with the superior courts of California to promptly record convictions against driver licenses and subsequently suspends or revokes licenses when a driver accumulates excessive convictions (as measured by a point-based system). It issues California license plates and driver's licenses. The DMV also issues identification cards to people who request one.

The DMV is part of the California State Transportation Agency.  It is headquartered in Sacramento and operates local offices in nearly every part of the state.  , the DMV employed over 8,900 people—35% at headquarters and 65% at 172 field offices (and various other locations). Also, it maintained records for 30,112,927 persons, 33,993,857 driver licenses and/or identification cards (there is overlap as some persons can and do hold both documents), and 35,391,347 vehicles. California has 26,957,875 licensed drivers.

On July 23, 2019, Governor Gavin Newsom released a report by the California Government Operations Agency "DMV Reinvention Strike Team" detailing recommendations for improving DMV transparency, worker training and performance, speed of service, and overall consumer satisfaction. As part of the release of the report, Newsom announced the appointment of Steve Gordon as the director of the California DMV.

History
In 1901, the California State Legislature authorized California cities and counties to issue licenses for operation of many types of wheeled vehicles within their boundaries, including bicycles and automobiles. From 1905 to 1913, the California Secretary of State was authorized to implement a uniform statewide registration and licensing system for motor vehicles.  In 1913, the Department of Engineering (predecessor of Caltrans) became responsible for registrations, and, the California State Treasurer became the custodian of vehicle records. Licenses for drivers of motor vehicles became mandatory in California on December 13, 1913.

The original "Motor Vehicle Department of California" was established by the Vehicle Act of 1915.  The provisions of the first Vehicle Act relating to the department went into effect 90 days after the close of that legislative session, while the rest of the act became effective at midnight on December 31, 1915.  Since the 41st legislative session adjourned on May 9, 1915, this meant the department came into existence 90 days later on August 7, 1915.

The department was reduced to the Division of Motor Vehicles within the Department of Finance in 1921.  Under the Vehicle Act of 1923, the Division was authorized to appoint inspectors and traffic officers to enforce the Act. These personnel were spun off in 1947 into the Department of the California Highway Patrol.  In 1929, the Division was transferred to the Department of Public Works (a descendant of the old Department of Engineering and an ancestor of Caltrans) and in 1931 DMV again became a full department. The DMV maintains a cadre of approximately 200 armed sworn state peace officers classified criminal investigators for enforcement duties relating to vessel or motor vehicle theft, vehicle or hull identification number and odometer fraud, chop shops, counterfeit or fraudulent DMV documents, disabled parking permit placard misuse, identity theft, unlicensed vehicle dealer ("curbstoner") and dismantler activity, out-of-state vehicle registration plate misuse to avoid California registration, internal employee investigations, etc.

The DMV began collecting a statewide Vehicle License Fee in 1936, in lieu of the personal property tax that individual cities and counties previously levied directly on motor vehicles regularly garaged within their borders (hence its nickname as the "in lieu tax").

The nation's first modern "credit card style" driver's licenses were introduced by the California DMV in January 1991. The plastic-coated design featured innovations like digitized photos, color holograms, and magnetic information strips readable by law enforcement.

In 2012, a bill introduced by California State Assemblyman Mike Gatto required the DMV to establish the California Legacy License Plate Program. This program allows California residents to order replicas of California license plates produced in the 1950s, 1960s, and 1970s. The original intent was for older cars to get new plates that matched the plate colors that the DMV issued for that car when it was new.  Due to lack of applications, the program was opened to all cars. For a license plate style to enter production, it needed to receive 7,500 paid applications by the January 1, 2015, deadline. Only the 1960s style plate (yellow lettering on black background) received the required number of orders. The DMV began production of the 1960s style plates at Folsom State Prison in Summer 2015.

Since 2015, more than a million illegal immigrants have been issued driver's licenses.

Driver Handbook 
The California Driver Handbook is a booklet published by the California Department of Motor Vehicles. Formerly titled the 'Vehicle Code Summary', it is usually about 96 pages of information relating to licenses, examinations, laws/rules of the road, road signs, seat belts, and health and safety issues. There are also several pages of advertisements.

See also

Department of Motor Vehicles
Government of California
Driver's licenses in the United States

References

External links
 Official website
 Department of Motor Vehicles in the California Code of Regulations

Motor Vehicles
Motor vehicle registration agencies
Road transportation in California
Government agencies established in 1915
1915 establishments in California
California State Transportation Agency